Koy Sanjaq Christian Neo-Aramaic is a variety of Northeastern Neo-Aramaic spoken by Christian Assyrians in Koy Sanjaq in the Erbil Governorate, Iraq. Koy Sanjaq Jewish Neo-Aramaic is a separate variety spoken by Jews in the same town.

See also
 Assyrian Neo-Aramaic
 Chaldean Catholic Church

References

Christian Northeastern Neo-Aramaic dialects
Koy Sanjaq